On 17 June 1974 the Provisional IRA bombed the British Houses of Parliament causing extensive damage and injuring eleven people.

Background

The Provisional IRA began a bombing campaign of mainland Britain in March 1973 when they bombed the Old Bailey court house, injuring over 200 people. The following year  was the worst year of the Troubles outside of Northern Ireland: at the beginning of 1974 the IRA exploded a bomb on a coach carrying soldiers and some family members on the M62, killing 12 people including four civilians. A month before the Houses of Parliament bombing, 34 people were killed in the Republic of Ireland in the Dublin and Monaghan bombings of May 1974 carried out by the Ulster Volunteer Force, the worst single incident of the conflict.

Bombing
A man with an Irish accent telephoned the Press Association with a warning given just six minutes before the device exploded. London police said a recognised IRA codeword was given. The bomb exploded in a corner of Westminster Hall at about 08:30 am on 17 June 1974.  The IRA in a telephoned warning said it planted the bomb that weighed around 20 lb (9.1 kg). The explosion is suspected to have damaged a gas main and a fire spread fast through the centuries-old hall in one of Britain's most security-tight buildings.
An annex housing a canteen and a number of offices was destroyed, but the great hall itself received only light damage. The attack signaled the start of a renewed IRA bombing campaign on Britain that was to last until late 1975 and was to claim the lives of dozens of people. The most notorious attacks of the bombing campaign were the Guildford pub bombings in October 1974 that killed five and injured 60, and the Birmingham pub bombings of November 1974, which killed 21 people and injured 180.

Aftermath
The year 1974 ended with the IRA killing 28 people (23 civilians and 5 British soldiers) in bombing operations in mainland Britain, 21 people were killed in the Birmingham pub bombings and a further 7 were killed in the Guildford and Woolwich Pub bombings. Nearly 300 people were injured from these bombings alone. The IRA called off their bombing campaign in February 1975 but restarted it in August 1975 with a bombing in a Caterham pub which  injured over 30 people. A week later the same IRA unit carried out the London Hilton bombing which killed 2 and injured over 60.

See also
1974 Tower of London bombing
Old Bailey bombing
Brook's bombing
List of attacks on legislatures

References

Houses of Parliament bombing
Houses of Parliament bombing
Provisional IRA bombings in London
1974 crimes in the United Kingdom
1970s crimes in London
Houses of Parliament bombing
Attacks on buildings and structures in 1974
Attacks on buildings and structures in London
Crime in Westminster
Parliament of the United Kingdom
Houses of Parliament bombing
1970s in the City of Westminster
Building bombings in London
Houses of Parliament bombing
Palace of Westminster
Fires in London